is a Japanese manga series written and illustrated by Kishi Azumi. It has been serialized in Shinchosha's seinen manga magazine Monthly Comic Bunch (originally titled Monthly Comic @Bunch until 2018) since September 2013. A television drama adaptation aired on TV Tokyo from October to December 2019, and an original net animation (ONA) adaptation by Typhoon Graphics was released on YouTube in February 2022.

Characters
Masamichi Shimura

Ishima

Rin Onoda

Media

Manga
Monthly Comic @Bunch changed its name to Monthly Comic Bunch starting on April 21, 2018. Shinchosha has collected its chapters into individual tankōbon volumes. The first volume was released on April 9, 2014. As of December 2022, twenty-two volumes have been released.

Volume list

Drama
A ten-episode television drama adaptation was broadcast on TV Tokyo from October 17 to December 19, 2019.

Original net animation
An 11-minute original net animation (ONA), animated by Typhoon Graphics in cooperation with Frontier Works, was posted on YouTube on February 9, 2022.

Reception
As of February 2022, the manga had over 4.5 million copies in circulation.

Notes

References

External links
  
  
 

2019 Japanese television series debuts
2019 Japanese television series endings
2022 anime ONAs
Manga adapted into television series
Seinen manga
Shinchosha manga
TV Tokyo original programming
Typhoon Graphics